Jørgen Nielsen Dam (born 30 October 1941) is a Danish long-distance runner. He competed in the men's 5000 metres at the 1964 Summer Olympics.

References

1941 births
Living people
Athletes (track and field) at the 1964 Summer Olympics
Danish male long-distance runners
Olympic athletes of Denmark
Place of birth missing (living people)